The  was a Japanese prototype amphibious tank developed in 1945. The production of prototypes was prepared during the last days of WWII, but it did not formally start.

The To-Ku was large and heavy; it boasted extensive armor protection with 50 mm of armor plate in the front hull. The turret was a modified version of the one used on the Type 97 Shinhoto Chi-Ha medium tank that was fitted with a Type 1 25 mm gun and a rear facing Type 97 7.7 mm machine gun. The front hull mounted a Type 1 47 mm tank gun and a Type 97 7.7 mm machine gun. The chassis was based on the Type 5 Chi-Ri medium tank and the suspension, pontoons and propulsion system were substantially the same as the Type 3 Ka-Chi. According to one source, a prototype was completed by the end of the war. According to another source, a prototype was not completed by the end of the war.

Notes

References

5 To-Ku
Amphibious tanks